Sir William Dawes, 3rd Baronet (12 September 1671 – 30 April 1724), was an Anglican prelate. He served as Bishop of Chester from 1708 to 1714 and then as Archbishop of York from 1714 to 1724. Politically he was a Hanoverian Tory, who favoured the Hanoverian Succession.

Education
Dawes was born at Lyons, near Braintree in Essex and from the age of nine attended Merchant Taylors' School in London. Already excelling in Hebrew by the age of 15, he was barely 18 when he wrote his work in verse: The Anatomy of Atheisme, and his eminent The Duties of the Closet in prose.

In 1687, William matriculated at St John's College, Oxford, of which college he also became a fellow, then migrated to St Catharine's Hall, Cambridge in 1689. He graduated Master of Arts (MA Cantab) from St Catharine's in 1695, on royal decree (per lit. reg.) due to his young age; in 1696 he graduated in theology of Doctor of Divinity (DD).

Anglican priest
William Dawes became the permanent pastor of William III (1688–1702) and was later court pastor of Queen Anne (1702–14). From 1698, at a young age, he was Canon of Worcester Cathedral.

He was Master of St Catharine's Hall, Cambridge between 1697 and 1714 and Vice-Chancellor of Cambridge, 1698–9.

In 1698 he was appointed rector in the village of Bocking (where the rector is called Dean of Bocking) near to his estates in Essex. Here he introduced the innovative custom of taking Holy Communion not only on the three great feasts, but once every month.

On 8 February 1708 he was consecrated Bishop of Chester: this was at the personal wish of Queen Anne, who overruled the advice of her ministers in appointing him. He was Archbishop of York from 1714 until his death in 1724 and a Privy Counsellor. He owed his advancement to the goodwill of the Queen and of his predecessor, John Sharp, who had great regard for him, and had great influence with the Queen: it was Sharp's dying request that Dawes succeed him at York, which the Queen happily granted. He restored the Archbishop's palace in York, the Bishopthorpe.

He died on 30 April 1724 from inflammation of the bowels. He was buried in the chapel of St Catharine's together with his wife. He was the most outstanding preacher of his period, a representative of the ideal of an aristocratic prelate, of a high and authoritative personality.

Family
William Dawes was the son of John Dawes, 1st Baronet of Putney and Jane (Christian) Hawkins the Daughter of Richard Hawkins of Bocking near Braintree Essex. According to Samuel Pepys, his parents' marriage gave rise to a good deal of gossip. His orphaned mother was an heiress, aged only sixteen, and it was claimed that her husband married her without her guardian's consent. After his father's death his mother remarried the noted shipbuilder Sir Anthony Deane, by whom she had eight more children.

William married Frances Cole d'Arcy (1673–1705; daughter of Thomas d'Arcy {1632–1693} and Jane Cole {1640–?}) on 1 December 1692, at St Edmund King and Martyr, Lombard St, City of London.

Their daughter Elizabeth married William Milner (?−1745), 1st Baronet of Nun Appleton Hall, MP for York in the early 18th century.

Styles and titles
1690–1695: Sir William Dawes 
1695–1696: The Reverend Sir William Dawes 
1696–1698: The Reverend Doctor Sir William Dawes 
1698: The Reverend Canon Doctor Sir William Dawes 
1698–1708: The Very Reverend Doctor Sir William Dawes 
1708–1714: The Right Reverend Doctor Sir William Dawes 
1714–1724: The Most Reverend and Right Honourable Doctor Sir William Dawes

References

 Stuart Handley, Dawes, Sir William, third baronet (1671–1724), Oxford Dictionary of National Biography, Oxford University Press, 2004
 
 The whole works of ... Sir William Dawes, in 3 volumes, with a preface, giving some account of the life ... of the author. London, 1732, 1733.

Attribution

1671 births
1724 deaths
Archbishops of York
Bishops of Chester
18th-century Anglican archbishops
Baronets in the Baronetage of England
Doctors of Divinity
Masters of St Catharine's College, Cambridge
Vice-Chancellors of the University of Cambridge
Alumni of St John's College, Oxford
Members of the Privy Council of Great Britain
Deans of Bocking
People from Braintree District
18th-century Church of England bishops
17th-century Anglican theologians
18th-century Anglican theologians